St. Michael's Primary School may refer to:

St. Michael's Primary School, Finnis, Finnis, County Down, Northern Ireland
St. Michael's Primary School, Mowhan, Mowhan, County Armagh, Northern Ireland
St. Michael's Primary School, Newtownhamilton, Newtownhamilton, County Armagh, Northern Ireland
St Michael's Primary School, Winterbourne, Gloucestershire, England
 St Michael's Primary School, also known as St Michael's Parish School, Ashburton, Victoria, Australia